{{DISPLAYTITLE:C7H8}}
The molecular formula C7H8 (molar mass: 92.14 g/mol) may refer to:

 Cycloheptatriene
 Isotoluenes
 Norbornadiene
 Quadricyclane
 Toluene, or toluol

Molecular formulas